Arthog railway station in Gwynedd, Wales, was a station on the  branch of the Aberystwith and Welsh Coast Railway (part of the Ruabon to Barmouth Line). It closed to passengers on 18 January 1965.

History
The station was built by the Aberystwith and Welsh Coast Railway, which became part of the Cambrian Railways before becoming part of the Great Western Railway. The line then passed on to the Western Region of British Railways on nationalisation in 1948, and was closed by the British Railways Board. A camping coach was positioned here by the Western Region from 1953 to 1962. According to the Official Handbook of Stations the following classes of traffic were being handled at this station in 1956: G & P and there was no crane.

The site today
The former trackbed is now the Llwybr Mawddach (or "Mawddach Trail"), but there are no remains of the station except for the access road running from the A493 to the station site.

Neighbouring stations

References

Sources

Further reading

External links
 Arthog station on navigable 1946 O. S. map

Disused railway stations in Gwynedd
Beeching closures in Wales
Railway stations in Great Britain opened in 1870
Railway stations in Great Britain closed in 1965
Former Cambrian Railway stations
Arthog